Tunde Bakare (born on 11 November 1954) is a Nigerian Prophetic-Apostolic pastor. He was reportedly arrested in March 2002 after preaching sermons critical of then-president Olusegun Obasanjo. Bakare was the running mate of the Nigerian presidential candidate Muhammadu Buhari in the 2011 Nigerian presidential election. He was a member and also Legal Adviser at the Deeper Life Bible Church before he left to join the Redeemed Christian Church of God where he not only became a Pastor but also originated and founded the Model Parish before he received the call to start the Latter Rain Assembly. The Latter Rain Assembly was later renamed, Global Citadel Community Church (CGCC).

Bakare was described by The Guardian as being one of the most politically influential pastors in Nigeria.

Early life
Bakare has said that he was born a Muslim, but converted to Christianity in 1974.

Bakare attended All Saints Primary School, Kemta, Abeokuta and subsequently Lisabi Grammar School, Abeokuta, after which he studied law at the University of Lagos between 1977 and 1980. He was called to the Bar in 1981 and following his NYSC, he practiced law with Gani Fawehinmi Chambers, Rotimi Williams & Co and Burke & Co, Solicitors. He established his own law firm Tunde Bakare & Co (El-Shaddai Chambers) in October 1984.

In May 1988, at the peak of his legal career he was called into ministry and he founded The Latter Rain Assembly (End-Time Church) now known as The Citadel Global Community Church (CGCC) on 1 April 1989 and is currently the Serving Overseer of the church.

He presides over Global Apostolic Impact Network (GAIN) – a network of churches, ministries and kingdom businesses committed to advancing the Kingdom of God on earth. Dr. Bakare is also the President of Latter Rain Ministries, Inc. (Church Development Center) in Atlanta, GA, USA, a ministry committed to restoring today's church to the scriptural pattern. He was given a Doctor of Ministry degree by the Indiana Christian University under the leadership of his mentor, Dr. Lester Sumrall in 1996.

Views
Bakare is critical of Miyetti Allah, saying that the Fulani herdsmen are a group of terrorists who rape, murder, and kidnap innocent civilians. Several Fulani Islamic scholars criticized Bakare's comments of Fulani herdsman as Islamophobic. Bakare had said in the past that Fulani herdsmen were driving Nigeria towards a civil war.

After the 2019 Nigerian general election, Bakare stated that he would run for president after the expiration of Muhammadu Buhari's second term in 2023. Bakare is a supporter of political Pan-Nigerianism. In 2018, Bakare announced that he would be starting his own political movement, titled "New Nigeria Progressive Movement".

Bakare has claimed that many pastors in Nigeria get away with "fake prophecies" because their followers often do not hold them accountable. Bakare was criticized however for claiming in a sermon in 2006, that Muhammadu Buhari would be a bad leader for Nigeria, yet he accepted the offer to be Buhari's vice-presedentical candidate in the 2011 election.

Tunde Bakare made his intentions of becoming the next president of Nigeria to church members in 2019 when he said, "I will succeed Buhari as President of Nigeria, nothing can change it. I am number 16, Buhari is number 15. I never said it to you before. I am saying it now and nothing can change it. In the name of Jesus, he (Buhari) is number 15. I am number 16. To this end was I born and for this purpose came I into the world. I have prepared you for this for more than 30 years". This led to politicians such as Ikechukwu Amaechi claiming the pastor had come up with a prophecy in the past.

References

External links
 

1954 births
Living people
Nigerian religious leaders
Nigerian Pentecostal pastors
People from Abeokuta
Yoruba Christian clergy
University of Lagos alumni
Pentecostal writers
Nigerian former Muslims
Nigerian television evangelists
Converts to Protestantism from Islam
Candidates in the Nigerian general election, 2011
People educated at Lisabi Grammar School